Woodleigh is a locality in the Murray Mallee region of South Australia. It is southeast of Loxton along the Browns Well Highway and the Taplan Road. The terrain is predominantly flat, sandy soil cleared for cropping. The population is dispersed among farmhouses with no population centre in the district. Mean annual rainfall is  falling on 78.9 days of the year. Woodleigh was never serviced directly by rail. The Loxton railway line was to the west and the Paringa railway line was to the east.

There was a hall at Woodleigh proposed as a Congregational hall to also be used as a community hall and school in 1912 on an acre of land donated by Mr J. Day. The hall had opened by the end of 1914 but was destroyed by fire on 16 October 1919. There was immediate enthusiasm to rebuild the hall.

References

Towns in South Australia